Morimus lethalis is a species of beetle in the family Cerambycidae. It was described by James Thomson in 1857. It is known from India, Vietnam, China, and Thailand.

References

Phrissomini
Beetles described in 1857